Berberys-R is a Polish multispectral camouflage system, reducing visibility in the visible and infrared spectra, to thermal vision, and to radiolocation signatures. It is manufactured by company Miranda sp. z o.o. (Poland). It is offered for individual soldiers, PT-91 and Leopard 2 MBT's, and also for the KTO Rosomak vehicle among others. It was used by Polish Army units participating in Operation Enduring Freedom in Afghanistan.

References

Military camouflage
Camouflage patterns
Military equipment introduced in the 2010s